Eric Regan (born May 20, 1988) is a Canadian-South Korean professional ice hockey defenseman who is currently playing for Anyang Halla in the Asia League Ice Hockey (ALH).

Playing career
Regan played major junior hockey in the Ontario Hockey League with the Erie Otters and the Oshawa Generals from 2004 to 2008.

Undrafted, on September 22, 2008, he was signed as a free agent by the Anaheim Ducks to a three-year, entry-level contract. Following the completion of his entry-level contract within the Ducks affiliations, Regan signed a one-year contract with German DEL team, the Hannover Scorpions, on June 7, 2011.

Following two seasons with the Scorpions, Regan opted to leave Germany and sign a contract in Asia with Japanese club, Nippon Paper Cranes, on August 9, 2013.

On May 29, 2015, Regan left High1 and joined his third Asia League club in as many seasons, signing with Anyang Halla initially on a one-year contract.

International play
After two years within South Korea, Regan was granted citizenship and made his debut for the national team at the 2016 IIHF World Championship Division I. He was a part of the historic South Korean team that gained promotion at the 2017 IIHF World Championship Division I to their first ever top ranked tournament at the 2018 IIHF World Championship in Denmark.

He was a member of South Korea's 2018 Winter Olympics team, in which they gained entry as the host nation.

Career statistics

Regular season and playoffs

International

Awards and honours

References

External links

1988 births
Living people
HL Anyang players
Bakersfield Condors (1998–2015) players
Elmira Jackals (ECHL) players
Erie Otters players
Hannover Scorpions players
High1 players
Asian Games silver medalists for South Korea
Medalists at the 2017 Asian Winter Games
Asian Games medalists in ice hockey
Ice hockey players at the 2017 Asian Winter Games
Ice hockey players at the 2018 Winter Olympics
Iowa Stars players
Nippon Paper Cranes players
Oshawa Generals players
San Antonio Rampage players
South Korean ice hockey defencemen
Canadian emigrants to South Korea
Olympic ice hockey players of South Korea
Syracuse Crunch players
Canadian expatriate ice hockey players in South Korea
Canadian expatriate ice hockey players in Japan
Canadian expatriate ice hockey players in Germany
Canadian expatriate ice hockey players in the United States
Naturalized citizens of South Korea